Henry White may refer to:

Politicians
Henry White (died 1570) (1532–1570), MP for Reigate and Downton
Henry White, 1st Baron Annaly (1791–1873), Irish British Army soldier and politician
Henry White (British politician) (1890–1964), British Labour Member of Parliament for Derbyshire North East
Henry White (Cape Treasurer General) (1813–1895), Cape Colony politician and Treasurer General
Henry White (diplomat) (1850–1927), American diplomat who signed the Treaty of Versailles
Henry A. White (born 1948), American educator and politician
Henry Graham White (1880–1965), British Liberal Member of Parliament for Birkenhead East

Others
Henry White (academic) (died 1538), English academic, priest, and lawyer
Henry White (footballer, born 1895) (1895–1972), English footballer
Henry White (footballer, born 1905) (1905–1992), Australian rules footballer
Henry White (photographer) (1819–1903), London lawyer and landscape photographer
Henry White (priest, born 1833) (1833–1890), English Anglican priest and chaplain of the Royal Chapel, Savoy
Henry White (Scottish footballer), Scottish footballer
Henry Clay White (1848–1927), American chemist
Henry Dalrymple White (1820–1886), British Army officer
Henry Eli White (1876–1952), New Zealand-born architect
Henry Fancourt White (1811–1866), Australian surveyor in South Africa
Henry Julian White (1859–1934), biblical scholar
Henry Kirke White (1785–1806), English poet
Henry Luke White (1860–1927), Australian grazier and ornithologist
Henry S. White (1844–1901), US Attorney for New Jersey, and Union Army surgeon
Henry Seely White (1861–1943), American mathematician

See also
Harry White (disambiguation)